Hebius igneus is a species of snake of the family Colubridae. The snake is found in China, Vietnam, and Thailand.

References 

igneus
Reptiles of China
Reptiles of Vietnam
Reptiles of Thailand
Reptiles described in 2021